KCPU may refer to:

KCPU-LP, a defunct radio station (106.7) formerly licensed to serve Bend, Oregon, United States
Calaveras County Airport, an airport near San Andreas, California, United States, assigned ICAO code KCPU